The Power of Five (re-titled as The Gatekeepers in the US) is a series of five fantasy and suspense novels, written by English author Anthony Horowitz. Published between 2005 and 2012, it is an updated re-imagining of Horowitz's Pentagram series, which the author had left unfinished in the 1980s after he only wrote four of the five planned books in the series. The novels deal heavily in the occult and examples of things such as human sacrifice and blood rituals are major plot elements, such as in the first book, where Matthew Freeman is hunted by a Cult who want to conduct a blood sacrifice on him to blast open a portal using a combination of nuclear physics and black magic, to unlock another dimension which is holding a group of ancient evil demons captive.

The series is published in the United Kingdom by Walker Books Ltd and in the United States by Scholastic Press.

Plot overview
The series focuses on five children: Matthew Freeman, Pedro, Scott Tyler, Jamie Tyler, and Scarlett Adams, a group of five modern day teenagers with some sort of power who are expected to defeat the Old Ones and save humanity.

Books

Raven's Gate (2005)

Matthew Freeman is a fourteen-year-old boy who lives in Ipswich with his aunt, Gwenda Davis and her boyfriend, Brian Conran. He lives with her because his parents died in a car crash when he was eight years old. While living with his aunt, he breaks into a warehouse filled with electronic equipment with his friend, Kelvin Johnson. The security guard apprehends them and tells them he has called the police. Kelvin panics and stabs the guard and then runs away. But when he is caught, he blames it on Matt. After they are caught, Matt is sent to Yorkshire on the L.E.A.F. (Liberty and Education Achieved through Fostering) Project, which involves sending troubled children into the countryside to get away from city temptations. Matt's foster parent is a woman named Jayne Deverill, who lives on a farm named Hive Hill, with a strange farmhand named Noah, who doesn't talk much.

When Matt goes down to the nearby village of Lesser Malling on an errand for Mrs Deverill he receives a warning from a strange man. The man warns him to get away from Lesser Malling before it is too late. So Matt tries to escape, and while trying to find some money he goes into Mrs Deverill's bedroom and finds a copy of the police report detailing his parents' deaths and his clairvoyant powers. Matt tries to escape Hive Hall by stealing the bike of Mrs Deverill's missing husband. He tries to ride away, but finds it impossible to escape, because which ever way he goes, he always ends up back at the same intersection in the forest he started at. He hears strange whispers and sees a light in the trees.

After a while, Matt discovers Omega One, an abandoned nuclear power station, in the woods and meets the man from Lesser Malling again. The man introduces himself as Tom Burgess, gives Matt a charm that prevents him from going in circles like before, and tells Matt to meet him at his house. Matt visits his house the next day and finds Tom Burgess murdered, with the words "Raven's Gate" painted on the wall in green. Matt runs away as fast as possible, then finds the police and tells them what he saw. They go back to the house where a woman named Miss Creevy says that Tom Burgess has gone to tend to his sheep and visit someone far away. He shows the police officers the scene where he saw Tom Burgess's body, but finds nothing. The words painted on the wall have been painted over.

To get information about Raven's Gate, he finds a book by someone called Elizabeth Ashwood, but the chapter on Raven's Gate is ripped out. When he searches on the Internet, an instant-mail box appears, and a man called Professor Sanjay Dravid talks to him, asking Matt who he is. Matt tells him his name, then the pop-up window disappears. The librarian tells Matt to go to the Greater Malling Gazette to find articles on Raven's Gate, and there he meets Richard Cole, a young journalist working there. Matt tells his story to him, but Cole doesn't believe him. And oddly, when he leaves the Gazette he finds Mrs Deverill waiting for him with Noah. They forcefully take Matt back to Hive Hall.

Later that night, Matt wakes up to see another light coming from Omega One, even though he found out from the gazette that it hadn't been used in 20 years. Matt knows something is going on and explores the woods. Near the power station he finds an old witchcraft ceremony going on with all the inhabitants of Lesser Malling involved. The power station lights are coming on and men are carrying materials into the building. Matt is noticed and Mrs Deverill summons some gruesome hounds from a fire to kill Matt. While Matt is being chased, he accidentally falls into a bog and begins to sink. Richard Cole arrives and rescues him, as Matt had used his power to call for help. The dogs arrive and Richard kills them by getting a can of gasoline stuffed with a handkerchief, lights it on fire, then throws it at the dogs setting them on fire. They then go back to Richard's house in York.

Richard now believes Matt's story because he remembers Omega One and says there were sections of the story he "couldn't get out of his head". Since Matt suspects that there is something odd about Omega One, they meet with the engineer who designed and built it, Sir Michael Marsh, but find out nothing except how a nuclear power plant works. Matt and Richard then go to visit Elizabeth Ashwood, the author of the book in the library. Elizabeth Ashwood is revealed to have died, but her daughter Susan is there. She advises them to go meet Professor Sanjay Dravid in London after Matt demands to know about Raven's Gate. She also tells them that she and Dravid are part of an organization known as the Nexus.

Richard and Matt travel to the Natural History Museum in South Kensington, London. Dravid tells Matt about the Old Ones. They were dark creatures who survived on human misery many years ago, and once wanted to rule the world, but were transported to another dimension by five children with supernatural powers. The Five, or the Gatekeepers, as they are also known, then built Raven's Gate to hold the evil creatures away. According to Dravid, Mrs Deverill and the villagers of Lesser Malling are part of a group of witches who seek the return of the Old Ones by opening Raven's Gate using witchcraft. Dravid tells Matt that he is a part of one of the five children who defeated the Old Ones, and has inherited their powers while Mrs Deverill and the citizens of Lesser Malling, who are all descendants of witches and warlocks, want to sacrifice him on the night of Roodmas, the day black magic is most powerful. Richard doesn't believe Dravid and begins to leave with Matt. But as Professor Dravid returns to his office to contact the Nexus and get his keys, he is attacked and walks out of his office with a cut in his neck and dies. Richard quickly takes his keys, but then is also attacked by dinosaur skeletons in the museum and at that moment hundreds of skeleton dinosaurs turn to life and attempt to kill Matt and Richard. Richard is trapped by a diplodocus's rib cage and then crushed by a girder. Matt is recaptured by Mrs Deverill, who animated the dinosaurs to kill them.

Matt wakes in the barn at Hive Hall, and to escape he slowly removes the floorboards in his room with a makeshift chisel. When Noah enters the room to take Matt to Mrs Deverill, he falls through the hole made by Matt, which was covered by a rug, and dies because he fell on his sickle. Matt runs away to the road, and a car comes towards him. It is the nuclear scientist who built Omega One, Sir Michael Marsh. But then Matt realises that Sir Michael is a traitor, working with the inhabitants of Lesser Malling, and Sir Michael explains that he was the one who bought the power station's uranium in the first place. Matt is taken inside Omega One, and realizes that it was built where Raven's Gate once stood. Richard Cole survived the ordeal at the museum and has been recaptured by the witches. They are taken to the inner sanctum, where Matt and the villagers are held in a magical protective circle, but Richard is left outside it to die in the heat of the nuclear reactor.

Sir Michael Marsh reveals that he needs Matt's blood to complete the black magic ritual that will open Raven's Gate. Marsh is about to stab the knife into Matt when Matt uses his powers to stop the knife. He defeats Marsh and frees himself and Richard. They escape to the lower levels of the power station but are followed by Mrs Deverill. She knocks out Richard and is about to kill Matt when Richard recovers and shoves Deverill into a pool of radioactive acid. Then they escape from Omega One by jumping into an underground river under the building. Back in the inner sanctum, the station's levels are at critical mass. The villagers panic and run out of the protective circle, killing them all and leaving Sir Michael Marsh alone. Marsh then realises there is a tiny drop of Matt's blood on the knife and stabs down with the knife, causing Raven's Gate to break and explode open. The King of the Old Ones climbs out of the portal and crushes Sir Michael to death. The power station then overloads and explodes, but all the heat and radiation is sucked into the gate, taking the Old Ones with it. The portal and the Gate are sealed and the Old Ones are once again trapped in their separate dimension.

Matt ends up living with Richard in York. They get a visit from Fabian, a member of Nexus, who has come to talk to him about a second gate in Peru. Richard doesn't want to go through all this again, but Matt explains he has no choice because he is a Gatekeeper and, as the Old Ones will try to break out again, it is his destiny to stop them when they do.

Evil Star (2006)

After the events of Raven's Gate, Matt goes to a new private school in which the Nexus are paying for, but is left friendless due to a bully named Gavin Taylor, who Matt unintentionally injures with his powers. Susan Ashwood and Fabian, members of the Nexus, ask him to help them acquire an old diary which could enable them to stop a second gate being opened. He refuses. Meanwhile, Gwenda Davis, his aunt, has fallen under the influence of dark forces in the form of television host, Rex McKenna. She kills her spouse Brian, steals a petrol tanker, and drives it into Matt's new school in a desperate attempt to kill him. Fortunately, he uses his clairvoyance powers and manages to evacuate the whole school before it happens. Matt realizes that he must stop the gate from being opened and agrees to meet the bookseller, Morton, at St Meredith's Church after a meeting with the Nexus. Morton affirms him to be one of the Five, but he is killed in the process and the diary is stolen by Diego Salamanda, another bidder who wants to use the diary to open the second gate. The Nexus persuade Matt and his carer, Richard Cole, to fly to Peru, find the second gate, and stay at a house belonging to Fabian. However, on their way to the planned rendezvous, the Hotel Europa, the car is ambushed and Richard is kidnapped but Matt manages to escape.

With the help of a local Peruvian, Pedro, Matt manages to get to the meeting place but is captured by the Peruvian police at the hotel, led by the sadistic Captain Rodriguez, and brutally beaten. Pedro saves him. Then, they escape to the Poison Town, where Pedro lives. Strangely while all the town is affected by diseases, the street in where Pedro lives in seems unaffected. Here, they meet the man Sebastian (who can speak English, unlike Pedro), who agrees to help Matt. As night passes, Matt meets Pedro in a dream, revealing that he is one of the Five. Matt finds the markings of his previous beatings have all gone. Thinking Salamanda had Richard kidnapped, Matt and Pedro travel to his hacienda in Inca, but they are discovered. Salamanda reveals that he does not have Richard. An Inca, Micos, one of Richard's kidnappers, helps them escape, and he is killed in the process. He tells them to travel to Cuzco before he dies, and there, Matt manages to contact Fabian and the Nexus on their whereabouts. However, Rodriguez and the police arrive but Matt and Pedro escape with the help of several Incas, led by Atoc, Micos' brother. Then they are taken to the Mountain of the Sleeping God Mandingo. From there, they descend into the town of the last Incas, Vilcabamba, where Richard, having been staying there after being separated, is waiting for them. There, Richard reveals that the kidnapping was conducted to prevent Matt from reaching the Hotel Europa. Based on the Salamanda's knowledge of their movements, Matt and Richard deduce that there is a traitor in the Nexus tipping him off. At the village, it is learned that the gate is located somewhere in the Nazca Desert. They travel to the Nazca Desert with Professor Chambers, an expert on everything Peruvian, and Matt realizes that the Nazca lines are the second gate. The gate will only open once all the stars align with each of the drawings, however, the gate has been constructed such that the stars will never all align at once, and in this case, the star Cygnus is not in its proper position. However, Salamanda has sent a satellite as a substitute star, an evil star, to open the gate. Matt and Pedro break into Salamanda's headquarters with some help of the Incas in an attempt to stop his plan by destroying the radio mast controlling the satellite. At the control center, it is revealed that Fabian is the traitor in the Nexus, having believed it was pointless to try and stop the opening of the gate. Rodriguez then bursts into the room and shoots Fabian when he tries to stop Matt and Richard from being killed. The radio mast is destroyed and falls into the building, flattening Rodriguez. In his dying moments, Fabian reveals that Salamanda had taken control of the satellite once it was in range, using a different satellite dish out in the desert. Atoc takes Matt and Pedro on a helicopter to the dish, but the helicopter crashes, killing Atoc and breaking Pedro's ankle. Matt has no choice but to stop the gate from being opened alone. He manages to trigger his power, destroying the dish and trailer Salamanda is using, and kills Salamanda when he shoots at Matt by deflecting two bullets back to him. However, the satellite is revealed to still be continuing on its trajectory, opening the gate. The Nazca lines crack open and an army of demons arise, before the King of the Old Ones himself appears, and challenges Matt. Matt uses his powers to wound them but he over-exerts himself and falls into a coma. The Old Ones, biding their time, temporarily hide from the world.
Matt is taken to Professor Chambers' house and a doctor examines Matt but does not think he will survive. But Pedro comes back from hospital early and insists on being alone with Matt. At this point, Pedro's power is revealed to be the power to heal. This explains the reason why the street Pedro lived in was the only place in Poison Town that was unaffected by disease. Matt awakes from his coma thanks to Pedro and decides that the only way they can defeat the Old Ones is to find the other three Gatekeepers.

Nightrise (2007)

This story begins with two men, Colton Bane and Kyle Hovey, who work for an evil corporation called Nightrise, waiting outside a theatre in Reno, Nevada. They are waiting to kidnap identical twin brothers Jamie and Scott Tyler, who are part of a magic show in the theatre. Their foster parent, Don White, sells the twins off to them, but Jamie and Scott escape and are pursued. Scott is captured but Jamie is rescued by a woman. He awakens at the woman's house, who introduces herself as Alicia and tells that her son, Daniel, was kidnapped by the same corporation after exhibiting clairvoyant powers. She takes Jamie to his foster parents' house only to realize they have been murdered, and escape the police only when Jamie uses his telepathic powers.

Alicia and Jamie go to Los Angeles where he reveals his backstory. He tells her of his previous foster parents and the weird and inexplicable "accidents" associated with them. He tells her about the strange tattoo he has and that he thinks he is an Indian. After these incidents, he and Scott refused to read or control anyone's minds but each other's. They find a lead to one of the men that kidnapped Scott, Colton Banes, and Alicia persuades Jamie to read his mind to find out where Scott is. Jamie manages to find out where Scott is being held: Silent Creek, a juvenile Centre, where he is being tortured in order to be on Nightrise's side.

Alicia decides to seek help from her boss, John Trelawny, who is running for presidency, and manages to convince him about Jamie's powers and to help him get into Silent Creek. Trelawny affirms Jamie's powers and agrees to help him. Jamie is given a false identity and crime and is put into the juvenile Centre.  When he arrives, Jamie meets an intake guard named Joe Feather.  Jamie manages to discover his brother is there in solitary confinement and Alicia's son Daniel is there too. One night, when he demands that a supervisor named Max Koring take him to his brother, he realizes that his powers do not work in the prison, because of some magnetic field that neutralizes special powers. Koring puts him in solitary confinement for his rudeness and secretly calls Banes to tell him he has found a Gatekeeper.

Jamie does not realize that the second gate was opened. In Peru, Richard and Professor Chambers find Pedro by the helicopter. Pedro tells them that Matt went by himself to stop the gate from opening. Thinking Matt is dead, Richard runs until he finds Matt. Matt "looks like all the life was sucked out of him" and is in a coma. After seeing he has a pulse, Richard runs back to bring get help for Matt.

Feather had examined him earlier and knew about his mysterious tattoo. He explains to Jamie that the twins are two of the Five, but Scott has already left Silent Creek. They work out a convincing plan to save Daniel and escape, whilst at the same time Colton Banes is on their way to Silent Creek. A fight goes on between Feather's tribe and Banes' men, resulting in Jamie being shot in the shoulder and Banes killed by an arrow.

Feather manages to break out with Daniel and Jamie, but Jamie falls unconscious when he is hit by a bullet, and a shaman is called on to bring him back. During this however, Jamie is transported back in time to the height of the war between humanity and the Old Ones ten thousand years ago in England. It becomes clear that the original Gatekeepers are exactly the same as the Gatekeepers in the present, just with different names (except for Matt, who says "I prefer to use my name from your world"). Matt is obviously the leader, and most knowledgeable of the Gatekeepers. In this past life, Jamie's gatekeeper persona was named Sapling.  He tells Jamie that he sent Sapling to his death on purpose, as the King of the Old Ones would then think he had won, however, should that occur, his counterpart from the future/past would take his place, hence why Jamie was there. Jamie then participates in the battle against the Old Ones, in which the Old Ones are defeated and banished, having mistakenly thought that only four of the Five could come together and letting their guard down. At the place where the Five congregate, a gate is built at the location the Old Ones were banished to, and would be called Raven's Gate by future generations. Jamie sees an eagle which Matt explains is there to take him back.

Jamie's body wakes up in the present and with Feather and Daniel travels back to Reno to reunite Daniel with Alicia, parting ways with Feather afterwards. When he is asleep that night, he is spoken to again by a grey man in the dream world of the Gatekeepers, who says that 'he is going to kill him'. He finally realised what it means, originally mistaking that the man was telling him that Scott was the one going to be killed, but he realizes that Scott is the person going to kill John Trelawny. Throughout the book, Nightrise has always wanted the other candidate, Charles Baker, to become president, who will support the return of the Old Ones. However, when Trelawny became too popular, assassination seemed the only option. It becomes apparent that this will take place during his birthday parade in his home town of Auburn.

Alicia, Danny and Jamie hurry to Auburn to stop the assassination. Jamie sees Scott with Susan Mortlake, a leader of Nightrise, in the crowd, and he tries to send a telepathic message to him, but it fails. Desperate, Jamie commands Warren Cornfeld, Trelawny's bodyguard and would-be assassin (being controlled by Scott), to aim the gun at Susan Mortlake. Cornfield shoots and kills Mortlake, and in chaos Jamie takes Scott and meets up with Alicia and Danny. They meet Natalie Johnson, a member of the Nexus and a friend of Trelawny, who gives them her car to escape. Policemen immediately come after them and the twins bid farewell to Alicia and Danny. Jamie and Scott use a hidden doorway in a cave at Lake Tahoe, and emerge in Cuzco, Peru at the Temple of Coricancha. The twins find their way to the Nazca desert and meet with Matt and Pedro, the first and second Gatekeepers.

Meanwhile, Scarlett Adams takes an airplane to Hong Kong to meet her father, who works for Nightrise. As Scarlett is about to go she finds out that John Trelawny has lost the election and that it is suspected that Nightrise has rigged the ballots.

Necropolis (2008)

Scarlett Adams' school tutor group is taken on a trip to St Meredith's Church where she sees a vision of Matt Freeman, who leads her to the door with the pentagram etched into it. There, she is transported to Ukraine, inside a monastery where she is captured by monks who worship the Old Ones. She is taken to the leader of the monastery, Father Gregory, who tells Scarlett of the Gatekeepers and the Old Ones. He and his followers built the monastery around the door in order to catch any of the Gatekeepers for the Old Ones should they come through. Scarlett is taken to a cell, and that night she has a dream about a dragon and a strange neon sign that says "SIGNAL ONE". Later, she escapes by attacking the monks and returning through the door. She returns to St Meredith's, but her eighteen-hour long disappearance has sparked a media storm.
In Peru, at Professor Chambers' hacienda, Matt finds out who Scarlett is through the media storm and decides that he should go back to London with the rest of the Five and his friend Richard Cole. However, later that night, a man named Ramon brings the diary belonging to St Joseph of Cordoba, claiming that he feels remorse for helping Diego Salamanda decode the diary. The diary contains the locations of twenty-five doors around the world that serve as portals to other doors. After studying the diary using his skills of reading old maps he learnt at university, Richard says that there are doors in Tuscany, Lake Tahoe, Cuzco, London, Ukraine, Cairo, Istanbul, Delhi, Mecca, Buenos Aires, the Australian outback, Antarctica and Hong Kong. Scott Tyler confirms Ramon's truthfulness by reading his mind, but the hacienda is then attacked and set on fire by strange zombies who kill Ramon with a fence post. Although their Inca allies arrive and finish off the zombies, Professor Chambers is mortally wounded and dies. Matt decides that the Five should split up so that the Old Ones cannot capture them all in one shot, and he, Jamie and Richard go to find Scarlett while Pedro and Scott go to the hidden Inca city of Vilcabamba to stay.

In London, Scarlett is trying to get back to her normal life, but can't when she notices strange men following her. She receives a strange phone call from her friend Aidan, who persuades her to go to Happy Garden, a Chinese restaurant, for a Chinese man wants to see her. However, the restaurant is destroyed by a bomb. She unwillingly goes to Hong Kong for her father, Paul Adams, who works for Nightrise Corporation.
Matt, Richard and Jamie arrive in London and nearly cross paths with Scarlett, but are held up by an accident orchestrated by the shape changers working for the Old Ones. They go to the Nexus headquarters where Matt realises Ramon's arrival at the hacienda was a trap laid by the Old Ones to stop them from getting to England before Scarlett left for China. Matt theorises that Ramon was hypnotized to give the diary back to the group to create the idea of using one of the doors to get to Hong Kong. There would be agents waiting to immediately capture them once they emerged through the Hong Kong door, so they decide to fly to Macau to seek help from one of the Nexus' contacts, Han Shan-tung on the recommendation of Mr. Lee, before taking a boat into Hong Kong.

Meanwhile, Scarlett arrives in Hong Kong, being looked after by Audrey Cheng, who claims her father is away on urgent business. Scarlett meets the sinister Chairman of Nightrise at The Nail, Nightrise's Hong Kong headquarters, who gives her an ornate jade necklace, which is in fact a tracking device. Whilst in Hong Kong, strange and ominous things start happening around her. A person trying to give her a letter disappears in a swarming crowd, and the people that she meets stare at her intently. Mrs Cheng and Karl, the chauffeur, seem robotic and lifeless, and the smog surrounding Hong Kong is thickening. Scarlett follows a trail of clues telling her to go to The Peak and over there, two agents kill Mrs Cheng, who is revealed to be a shape-changer who is one of the Old Ones in human form. Scarlett is then taken to Lohan, whose agents have just helped her escape the Old Ones, and when the building is attacked by Old Ones and the police, they help her to escape again. She is then disguised as a boy, and pretends to be the son of a couple who are boarding a ship departing Hong Kong to Macau, where she will meet with the other Gatekeepers. However, her father, stationed at the jetty, finds her and hands her over to the chairman, who recaptures her believing that it will help her, and keeps her at Victoria Prison. A dream call by Scarlett wakes a dragon (a metaphor for a typhoon), which starts to move towards Hong Kong.
Matt, Jamie and Richard arrived in Macau where they meet Han Shan-tung, who reveals himself as "The Master of the Mountain", the leader of the White Lotus Society, a Triad based in Macau and Hong Kong. Shang-tung explains that Scarlett has been taken prisoner by the Old Ones who plan to turn Hong Kong into a necropolis, a city of the dead, by using poisonous gases mixed with the pollution from mainland China that will suffocate and kill the residents there. Shang-Tung believes Scarlett is a reincarnate of the Chinese weather goddess, Lin Mo, and has had his people watch over her all her life. He agrees to help them after affirming that Matt and Jamie are indeed part of the Five with a test: climbing a sword ladder.

Later that night Richard, Matt and Jamie Tyler travel by boat to Hong Kong and come under attack by the Hong Kong police (under the control of the Old Ones) after they are betrayed by the captain. In the struggle, Matt loses Richard and Jamie, arriving in Hong Kong alone. He sees people dying in the street because of the pollution, and recognizes several of the Old Ones' servants. Matt makes his way to Wisdom Court, where Scarlett's father now resides. Once there Matt lets himself be captured by the Chairman after being betrayed by a despondent Paul Adams, attempting to barter him for Scarlett. However, Adams is killed and Matt is taken to the same cell as Scarlett in Victoria Prison where they share their experiences. Matt reveals that his being captured was in fact a plan he had made with her father. He knew that the only way to get near her was to be caught, so he had contacted Lohan and his men earlier, telling them of his plan, and then Scarlett's father had agreed to call Nightrise in order to turn in Matt, even at expense of his own life. Matt also explained that he knew the Old Ones would think it was amusing to see two of the five Gatekeepers briefly imprisoned in the same room, before they were imprisoned in different rooms in different sides of the world. Because their powers are strengthened when together they begin to think of escaping.
The meaning of "Signal One" is then explained. It is part of the Hong Kong Observatory warning system on the intensity of typhoons. To the Chinese, typhoons are also known as the dragon's breath, explaining the dragon Scarlett had been dreaming of in the Gatekeeper's dream world. She has the ability not just to predict, but to control weather conditions. It is also revealed that Scarlett knew of the typhoon and the power it would bring. Richard and Jamie find Lohan and he bands together his men to rescue Scarlett and Matt under cover of the rising storm Scarlett has made and take the prison, where he followed Matt to when he was being captured. The impending storm is creeping higher up the scale. Jamie knows that Scott will be able to feel the danger Jamie is in, and that he will try and use the door that leads to the Tai Shan Temple, which will undoubtedly be guarded. The group, along with Scarlett, who diverts the storm from them while it destroys everything around them, run to the temple to kill the guards protecting it before Scott arrives, which would result in his death or capture.

At The Nightrise headquarters, a wooden sampan picked up by the typhoon smashes into the Chairman's office and ironically kills the Chairman. Meanwhile, Lohan's men kill all but one of the Old Ones' agents, who is wounded but hides. Scott and Pedro travel through the door and the last Old One agent aims at Jamie, but Scott pushes him out of the way and the bullet hits Scarlett in the head, rendering her unconscious. Without Scarlett to hold the typhoon back, it unleashes its full strength on them and disintegrates the temple. Jamie and Scott, Richard and Scarlett, Pedro, and Matt and Lohan dash through the door moments before the temple is destroyed, escaping the typhoon. Then the storm finally abates, revealing Hong Kong completely destroyed (although all the pollution was swept away). All of the Five are separated all over the world with their partners, due to having no preassumed destination decided between all of them, also it is said that since the door collapsed as they were going through it, one final trick was played on them. They jumped 10 years in time after entering the door, and meanwhile, Chaos, the King of the Old Ones, prepares to commence the war to conquer the planet and wipe out humanity.

Oblivion (2012)

Jamie Tyler ends up in St Botolph's church in Boston, England where he meets Holly, a Villager. The other four Gatekeepers have ended up across the world, and after coming through the doors they realize that the world they knew has changed dramatically owing to the fact that ten years has passed in the time it took them to pass through the doors.

Scarlett Adams, accompanied with Richard Cole, ending up at the great pyramids of Giza, in Egypt. As soon as they arrive, they are attacked by soldiers working for the Old Ones, but the rebel militia, supported by Nexus arrive and bring them to a rebel hospital where Albert Rémy is waiting for them. Tarik, the head of the rebel resistance, asks Scarlett to assassinate the dictator of Egypt, Scarlett refuses to kill in cold-blood.

Rémy dies in a shoot-out, and Scarlett and Richard travel to Dubai in the hopes of securing a plane ride. To gain the attention of the ruling Sheikh, Scarlett gambles a large sum of number at his casino. Winning it, the Sheikh rules it void as she is underage but he invites her and Richard to dinner.

Matthew Freeman ending up, accompanied with Lohan Shan-tung, at the Basilica de Nossa Senhore de Nazare in Belem, Brazil. With no means of transport, they decide to sell Matt off to buyers for a lot of money, since he is white and in good health, but then Lohan follows him and rescues him. This happens three times, but on the fourth time, the previous owner of Matt, a drug lord, sends his minions to bring him back.

Scott Tyler and Pedro are captured by the Old Ones after they exit the door at the Abbey of San Galgano in Italy. Jonas Mortlake converts Scott to the ways of the Old Ones, by offering him wealth and a luxury lifestyle. Whilst Pedro has his little finger broken by Jonas' henchmen under orders from Scott. Scott travels with Jonas to Oblivion, Antarctica and tricks Matt into meeting with him. Even though Matt knew it was trap, he still came and tells Scott so. Scott is surprised and even angry, but Matt tells him that they all have a part to play, but Matt's was never to save the world, it was Scott's.

Matt is tortured on a rack by the Old Ones and the chairman of Nightrise Corporation. Richard is brought in to witness it, and to die so to spite Matt, however Richard kills Matt with the sacrificial tumi given to him by The Incas. This allows the Past Matt to be brought forward into the future to defeat the Old Ones.

At the same time, Scott feels guilt over his actions and travels to the door to open it. He is ambushed by Jonas who beats him up, but is saved by the arrival of Scarlett and Lohan, who kills Jonas with a knife. Scott immobilises Scarlett and Lohan so he can sacrifices himself to allow Pedro, his brother (and Holly) to travel through the door, by opening it but gets electrocuted in the process. Scott dies in Jamie's arms, and Richard exits from the crumbling fortress of the Old Ones, with Matt's body. But the Past Matt and Scott from the past, Flint, arrive. Once again the downfall of the Old Ones is due to the fact that the Five are replaced by their predecessors 10,000 years ago when they die.

The Five Gatekeepers defeat Chaos by impaling him with their swords, forming a five pointed star.

After the battle, they all have a celebratory meal. Matt gives the other Gatekeepers a chance to stay and rebuild Earth or come with him to the Dreamworld. All the five decide to travel to the Dreamworld, where they meet the Librarian, and a woman, who to each of them seems to have a different appearance, as a motherly figure.

The end is narrated by Holly who with Richard and Lohan travel back home. Lohan goes East to find his family and friends, he is never heard from again but Holly is sure that as a hardened criminal, he would have reached home. Holly and Richard travel back to the underground pod in London, where they find that Susan Ashwood has died peacefully. The survivors decide to move and live in an abandoned village. Both Holly and Richard marry and have children. They both know that one day, they will visit the Dreamworld and never return.

List of characters

Main characters

Matthew Freeman (introduced in Raven's Gate)
Matt is the leader of the Five. He was born in London, England, to an English mother and a father from New Zealand. However, after the death of his parents, he went to live in Ipswich with his aunt, then York. He spent the first few years of his life growing up with his kind and loving parents. They were of comfortable financial stature, though they were not rich. On the morning of the wedding of a family friend, Matt claimed he was ill (when really what had happened was that he had had a premonition of his parents' death, and did not want to go with them, later regretting not trying to save them from their death) and was left with a neighbour, Rosemary Green, while his parents went. Matt reveals to the disbelieving neighbour the details of an accident in which his parents are killed. Afterwards, a police officer arrived and informs them that his parents' car has toppled off a bridge and that both his parents are dead. Mrs Green is sick with shock.

Matt was fostered by his Aunt Gwenda and her partner, Brian Conran, who was abusive to his girlfriend and spent Matt's inheritance on luxuries. They then started to abuse and neglect Matt when the money ran out. His performance at school suffered accordingly and he soon falls under the influence of a local petty criminal, Kelvin Johnson, who encouraged him to start stealing, truancy, vandalism, smoking and petty crime.

After a botched warehouse theft which culminated in the stabbing of a security guard, Matt is placed on the LEAF project (Liberty and Education Achieved through Fostering). He is placed in the care of Jayne Deverill, an old lady living in Lesser Malling. Taking an immediate disliking to her, Matt tries to escape several times but does not succeed. After spending three days in a fever hearing people talk about him in a sinister fashion and seeing an odd ritual going on in the remains of an abandoned nuclear power plant he encounters Richard Cole, a local journalist. Matt attempts to explain but Cole does not believe him and leaves him on his own.

After speaking with the nuclear plant's creator, Sir Michael Marsh and two members from a shadowy organisation known as Nexus, Matt realised that he was one of five Gatekeepers, reincarnated after ten thousand years. He is then captured, dragged inside the power plant and tied upon an altar with a cross of Jesus Christ hanging above him upside down. Matt finds that he is going to be sacrificed with a sacrificial knife for his blood in satanic rituals, and a nuclear explosion will be used to open the gate. Richard Cole is going to be burnt to death after being left out of the protective circle. However, before the Old Ones can escape Raven's Gate, Matt managed to trigger his power and stop the knife from going through his heart. The vacuum created by the subsequent nuclear explosion sucks the Old Ones back in along with the villagers. Before the explosion, a furious Mrs Deverill chases Matt and Richard downstairs into a power plant room with an acid pool. Mrs Deverill manages to knock Richard out, and she and Matt have a fight which ends in Mrs Deverill attempting to crush Matt's windpipe with an extremely heavy pole. Before this can occur, however, Richard regains consciousness and pushes Mrs Deverill into the pool of acid. After this incident, Matt begins living with Richard in York, supported by the Nexus.

At the beginning of Evil Star, Matt is attending a private school, financed by The Nexus. He uses his powers to save the entire school from being blown up by his possessed aunt Gwenda driving a petrol tanker, after murdering her boyfriend Brian Conran with a kitchen knife. The Nexus recruited him once again in order to prevent Diego Salamanda from opening the second gate, built into the Nazca plains to release the Old Ones. Matt travels to Peru and is collected by the manservan of Fabian, a member of the Nexus to be taken to the Hotel Europa. Their car is ambushed by some mysterious attackers who kidnap Richard Cole but Matt escapes.

Upon hiding from the ambushers, Matt discovers a boy of his age known only as Pedro, who it is revealed is another Gatekeeper. Matt decides to go to the hotel after all but is ambushed by the Peruvian police force, led by Captain Rodriguez, who viciously attacks him. Escaping with some cracked ribs, Matt manages to travel to Pedro's home, where he learns of Pedro's past and the situation of the poor Peruvians. Matthew is sent, with Pedro, to travel to Cuzco, where they would find aid. Eventually, they gained the friendship of the local Incas, and traveled to the city of the Incas where Matt finds Richard, who was kidnapped by the Incas prior to Matt's travels. Matt journeys upland where he meets Professor Joanna Chambers and learned the location of the second gate, and learns that Salamanda has a base in the desert. Matt, Richard, the Incas and Pedro attack the base, disarming the headquarters which Salamanda is using to awaken the Old Ones, where it is revealed Fabian is at traitor, employed by Salamanda

Matt and Pedro are flown to Salamanda's main base of operations, in the desert but their helicopter is shot at and they crash.  This leads the Old Ones to triumph and enter the Earth once again. They defeat Matt and leave him to die. However, Richard and Professor Chambers arrive. Pedro returns from hospital and uses his power, faith healing, at the last minute and revives Matt.

Matt only makes two very brief appearances in Nightrise: in a flashback when he was left to die in the desert and Richard Cole rescues him, and at the end of the book when he and Pedro meet Jamie and Scott Tyler at Professor Chambers's hacienda. His past self also appears in Nightrise when Jamie is sent back into the past, at approximately 8000 BCE.

In Necropolis, Matt is living with Professor Joanna Chambers, Richard, Pedro, Jamie and Scott in Peru. He reads an article about Scarlett Adams who had been missing for a day after walking through a door in Saint Meredith's Church in London, England. He determines that she is  the fifth and final Gatekeeper but so do the Old Ones. He goes to London to find her with Richard and Jamie.

They arrive to find out from Scarlett's housekeeper, Mrs Murdoch, that Scarlett's father has rushed her to Hong Kong on apparent "urgent business". A subsequent meeting with the Nexus confirms that the Old Ones have trapped Scarlett in Hong Kong in hope of luring Matt there too. It is then revealed that Scarlett's father works for Nightrise Corporation and so will give Scarlett to the Old Ones. With no other choice Matt, Richard and Jamie travel to Macau and meet Han Shan-tung, who is the leader of the White Lotus triad, he tells them to meet his son, Lohan, once they arrive in Hong Kong. Matt is separated from Jamie and Richard after Nightrise Corporation attack their boat. Matt is forced to walk the streets alone, covered in a thick smog that suffocates the residents. This is the Old One's plan to turn Hong Kong into a necropolis, a city of the dead. Matt sees people dead or dying on Hong Kong's streets. He even sees some of the creatures that broke out of the Nazca Lines such as a horse with a knife struck through its head like an evil unicorn.

Matt visits Paul Adams' apartment where he discovers that Paul is worried sick about Scarlett. The next morning The Chairman of Nightrise kills Paul, captures Matt and takes him to where Scarlett is being held hostage, as an attempt to humiliate two of the Gatekeepers. Richard, Jamie and two of Lohan's men break Scarlett and Matt out of prison. Matt and Scarlett then discover the typhoon which is destroying Hong Kong.

Scarlett manages to protect her and the others with her powers and they finally reach a temple with a magic door, which can take them safely back to Peru. The temple is protected from the typhoon whilst Scarlett is inside. As they reach the door, Scarlett is shot by a Nightrise agent, leading the temple to collapse. The Gatekeepers travel through the door by the storm but are separated and scattered around the world in the process. They also jump 10 years in time, during which The Old Ones along with Nightrise Corporation extend their influence throughout the world and wreak havoc.

By the start of Oblivion, Matt is travelling with Lohan through Brazil after travelling through the door in Hong Kong. Matt is repeatedly sold as a slave by Lohan and then rescued in order to make money. One night, Matt falls asleep and visits the Dreamworld, there he visits the Library and asks the Librarian for his story, to know what will happen in the end. He is horrified at reading what will happen to him, but he summons the other Gatekeepers by ringing a bell. Pedro, Scarlett, Jamie and Scott Tyler arrive, and greet him, although Scott is distant. Matt tells them that he knows what will happen but does not reveal anything else, he tells them to get to a door and travel to Oblivion, Antarctica. The doors are locked but he tells them that they will know when to travel.

Lohan sells Matt for a fourth time but they are both taken as slaves to a gold mine. Matt comes down with a fever and is too ill to use his powers to escape. When Matt is recovering, they initiate their escape when Matt collapses the mine tunnels and breaks the ladders causing mass panic. Matt and Lohan travel towards the helicopter pad, Lohan decides to desert him and travel away. Matt senses this and comes after him, Lohan changes his mind and they fly to Oblivion.

After reaching Oblivion, they meet Scarlett and Richard who have flown from Dubai to Antarctica. They meet the commander of the World Army, the human army opposing the Old Ones. The commander wants to attack the Old Ones' palace, but it is all a ruse and the World Army is overrun. Only Matt holds the Old Ones' minions back.

Matt is captured by Scott, who has defected, and is tortured by the Old Ones and the Chairman of Nightrise. Richard is taken up to see him, and is heartbroken, but Matt mouths something to him and Richard understands. Richard plunges the sacrificial tumi, the 'invisible sword' from the Incas, into Matt's heart, killing him. Everyone is shocked but at the same time an earthquake seems to happen. Richard escapes the rubble with Matt's body. Chaos arrives as does, the Matt from the Past, and Flint, Scott from the past, who have been brought forward in time after their future selves both died. The Five Gatekeepers battle Chaos and kill him when they each impale him with their swords, forming a five pointed star.

In his past life Matt was the leader of the Gatekeepers. He alone had the knowledge of the Old Ones and how to defeat them, although the source of this knowledge seems to have from been his life story that he read in the Library. Unlike the other Gatekeepers of that period, Matt was referred to by his modern name, saying "he likes that one better".

It is possible that Matt could have some kind of divine name as the past battle with the Old Ones was so long ago that myth may have been passed down depicting Matt as a god or another celestial being. Indeed, this is highly likely as Pedro's past life, Inti, was worshiped by the Incas, in Scar's past life, she was Lin Mo, the Chinese goddess of the sea, and in Jamie and Scott's past lives, they were the Iroquois Indian gods, Sapling and Flint. The four of them represent South America, Asia, and North America, respectively, with Matt representing Europe.

Matt is a very advanced telekinetic, but does not have full control over his abilities and it is stated it can only work under massive desperation. However, by the fourth book, Necropolis, he has learned to use his abilities on command as he has met three of the other Gatekeepers. The full extent of his powers remains unknown. Towards the end of the final book, his telekinetic powers have grown to such an extent that he is (almost singlehandedly) able to hold his own against all thirteen of the fire riders. At one point Matt is able to crack and push apart an Antarctic ice shelf to create a chasm "... hundreds of meters deep ..." and has Scarlett Adams wondering "... if there was any limit to his power ..."

Pedro (introduced in Evil Star)

Pedro is the second of the Five and is first introduced in the second book, Evil Star. Pedro lived as a beggar in Lima, Peru.

Pedro began life in a small village in the Canta province. When he was young the River Chillón burst its banks and Pedro's family were killed. A group of survivors traveled with Pedro to Lima. Pedro eventually ended up in the care of a man named Sebastian with many other children in Poison Town. He lived there performing tricks to people passing by and robbing rich tourists. However, he then met Matthew Freeman and travelled with him.

Pedro also bears a strong resemblance to Manco Cápac, the founder of the Inca Empire. Pedro's power is healing. He could heal people by being around them. He only realised his power at the end of Evil Star when he helped Matt after he was injured by Chaos, the King of the Old Ones. He discovered that during the stay with his carer Sebastian in Ciudad del Veneno, known as Poison Town in English, none of the people around him got sick due to his healing abilities, and when Matt slept at the house where Pedro lived he noticed his scars from a previous fight had vanished.

He is described as being extremely skinny with long dark brown hair and brown eyes. His past incarnation is named Inti. Pedro is 14 years old in Evil Star and Nightrise, but is then 15 in Necropolis. He had tried to heal Scott after Susan Mortlake tortured him by trying to control him but could not as the scars of the wound were too deep. By the time of Necropolis, he had learned enough of the English language to be able to communicate with the other four gatekeepers.

In Necropolis, he went through the doorway in the Tai Shan Temple along with Scott, and ended up in Italy 10 years later. He was held as a prisoner in a castle situated in Naples, along with Scott. After a few weeks of being held in prison, Scott under the influence of the Old Ones joins their side along with Jonas Mortlake, son of Susan Mortlake, while Pedro afterwards escaped the prison and travelled to Rome with the help of an Italian boy named Giovanni. He used the door in St. Peter's Basilica in Rome to get to Oblivion, Antarctica where he and the remaining four finally defeat the Old Ones. After winning the battle, he joins Matt and the other three to live in the dreamworld situated beyond the mountains of Oblivion.

Pedro can communicate with the other four of the five in the dream world.

Scott and Jamie Tyler (introduced in Nightrise)
Native-American twins Jamie and Scott Tyler are two of the Five Gatekeepers. Jamie and Scott are orphans who, after several failed fostering attempts, ended up with an abusive guardian known as 'Uncle Don' where they were forced to work as part of a magic act in Reno, Nevada, USA. After a performance Scott is kidnapped and both physically and mentally tortured by the sinister Nightrise Corporation at a privately owned juvenile prison called Silent Creek, in the outskirts of Nevada. Jamie is rescued by a woman of the name Alicia McGuire, who is on a quest to find her long lost son Daniel McGuire, and suspects that Nightrise had kidnapped him and many other children with paranormal abilities (Daniel has a Precognition ability). With the help of John Trelawney, a senator going for president of the US, Jamie creates a plan to free Scott by going to Silent Creek, a place of which Nightrise was keeping Scott which Jamie found out after seeing into the mind of a Nightrise worker. Jamie almost doesn't escape but is saved by an Incan tribe. He is too late to rescue Scott and is injured while escaping from the prison, however, he does manage to find Daniel McGuire. While he is injured and close to death Jamie is transported to the past, during the war against the Old Ones ten thousand years ago. He learns that he and Scott are Gatekeepers, and that he has replaced his previous incarnation Sapling, who had been killed.

After helping to seal the Old Ones in the past, Jamie is returned to his time, where he is able to track down Scott. Jamie arrives in time to stop Scott, who had been brainwashed into killing Senator Trelawney, in order for Nightrise's candidate, Charles Baker, to win the election. The two of them escape through a doorway in a cave in Lake Tahoe where they were found when they were born, and arrive in Cuzco, Peru where they meet Matt and Pedro. However, Scott is still mentally damaged due to his torture and despite Pedro's healing abilities he becomes unbalanced after being separated from Jamie. When all of the Gatekeepers are scattered, Scott ends up captured with Pedro in Italy and Jamie appears alone in England. As the others work to reunite in Antarctica, the Old Ones take advantage of Scott's mental state and convince him to betray the others until Matt sacrifices himself, allowing Scott to realise the error of his ways. To make amends Scott sacrifices himself to bring the other Gatekeepers together, after which he dies and is replaced by his previous incarnation, Flint, allowing Jamie and the other Gatekeepers to defeat the Old Ones. Jamie and Flint then enter the restored dream world with the other Gatekeepers.

Jamie and Scott are identical twins and members of the Washoe tribe. Their previous incarnations are Sapling (Jamie) and Flint (Scott). Jamie and Scott have the power of astral projection and Telepathy (including mind control), particularly between each other, at times exhibiting Morphic resonance.

Scarlett Adams (introduced at the end of Nightrise and in Necropolis)
Scarlett is the fifth Gatekeeper. She appears to be Eurasian, or completely Asian, but was adopted by Europeans and lived in Dulwich. Her parents divorced and moved to other countries, leaving Scarlett behind to complete her studies. Scarlett is first found by the Old Ones when she goes through one of the doorways in St Meredith's Church while on a school trip, and ends up in the Cry For Mercy in Ukraine, where she is captured by a monk who tells her the story of who she is, and makes a narrow escape. Her father, Paul Adams, worked for the Nightrise Corporation and forced Scarlett to fly to Hong Kong to see him, saying that a crisis had arisen, although it was a trap as the Old Ones had control of the city and knew she was a Gatekeeper. However, Scarlett was able to escape temporarily with help from a man called Lohan and a group of Triads known as the White Lotus. The Triads also try to smuggle Matt and Jamie into the city, but they were betrayed and separated.

Matt and Scarlett were both captured and held prisoner by the Nightrise Corporation, but escaped with help from the White Lotus triads during a powerful typhoon that Scarlett had unconsciously summoned. The Five are briefly united at the Tai Shan Temple, but Scarlett is shot and seriously injured. When the Gatekeepers are separated she ends up in Cairo, Egypt with Matt's friend Richard Cole. The two of them narrowly avoid becoming unknowing suicide bombers and head to Dubai where they hope to find a plane to take them to Antarctica where they can reunite with the other Gatekeepers. They rescue the pilot of an airbus from the mad king of Dubai and are the first of the Five to arrive at Oblivion, Antarctica. After the defeat of the World Army at Oblivion, Scarlett and Lohan sneak into the Old Ones' fortress and find Scott, but are unable to stop him from sacrificing himself. Once the Old Ones are defeated, Scarlett joins the other Gatekeepers in the restored dream world.

Scarlett bears a strong resemblance to and is described by some as Lin Mo, the Chinese goddess of the sea. Her previous incarnation, also called Scarlett but known as Scar, found Jamie when he was transported to the past. Scarlett has the power of Weather manipulation, including forecasting, as well as astral projection.

Other characters

Richard Cole (introduced in Raven's Gate) 
Richard Cole makes an appearance throughout Raven's Gate, Evil Star, Nightrise, Necropolis and Oblivion. Richard is Matt Freeman's guardian following the events in Raven's Gate. He worked as a journalist for a small newspaper before he got fired. When the Five get separated after going through the door in Hong Kong, Richard follows Scarlett and vows to protect and stay with her. At Oblivion, when the Old Ones are torturing Matt they take Richard up to the podium so Matt can watch Richard be killed, but using the knife the Inca's gave him he kills Matt, to save him from a lifetime of torture. Richard ends up in a small village with Holly, married and with one son that he called Matt. It is thought that when he dies, he will live in the dream world.

Lohan (introduced in Necropolis) 
Lohan appears in the fourth and fifth books of the series, Necropolis and Oblivion. He is Incense Master in the White Lotus Society and his father is Master of the Mountain. He is appointed as Scarlett Adams’ protector during the events of Necropolis. In Oblivion, he ends up with Matt in Brazil, where he sells Matt to become a slave, takes the money, and rescues him. He almost abandoned Matt at a gold mine to save himself, but Matt stops him.

Holly (introduced in Oblivion) 
Holly appears in the fifth book of the series, Oblivion. She accompanies Jamie Tyler after the society she lives in is burnt down by the police in an attempt to kill the inhabitants. With help from the 'Traveler' they escape to London. At Oblivion, Antarctica she shoots a series of bullets into Chaos. She also is the «author» of the books.

Noah (introduced in Raven's Gate) 
Noah appeared in the first book of the series, Raven's Gate. He is Mrs Deverill's farmhand. He can't speak properly and takes a dislike to Matt. It is believed that he has mental problems. At the end of the novel he dies when he is killed by his own sickle plunging through his stomach when he falls through the top floor of the barn made by Matt. Matt describes him as being fat and greasy.

George (introduced in Oblivion) 
George appears in the fifth book of the series, Oblivion. He is one of the Villagers, living with Rita, John and Holly and working at the local village bakery. George is at home when Holly comes in to tell them about Jamie Tyler. When Jamie comes to stay at Rita and John's house, it appears that George is jealous of him and the attention . He doesn't talk to him. At school, Jamie and George get into a fight, after George apparently goads Jamie. When Miss Keyland calls the police about Jamie, they round up the Villagers in the square. When no one knows where Jamie is, the police kill everyone. However George manages to escape but is shot in the process. He finds Holly, Jamie and the Traveller about to be shot by a policeman. Although he is injured, he hits the police man over the head with a cricket bat, and picks up his machine gun. He creates a diversion whilst the others flee onto the Lady Jane. As they leave, Holly hears a scream and knows that George has died. He is eighteen years old. He is described as rather plump, although muscular due to working at the village bakery, he had blond hair and blue eyes. He is quite quiet. Although he does not look like much, according to Holly, she would choose him to stick up for herself. Holly loves him like a brother.

Captain Rodriguez (introduced in Evil Star) 
Captain Rodriguez appears in the second book of the series, Evil Star. At first he was an ordinary policeman, but when Diego Salamanda takes over the police, Rodriguez becomes his head of security at the base in Nazca, after being corrupted by Salamanda's money.

Charles Baker (introduced in Nightrise) 
Charles Baker appears in the third book of the series, Nightrise, and is mentioned in the fourth book, Necropolis. According to Nightrise employee Susan Mortlake, Baker is sympathetic to their aims. The Nightrise Corporation back Baker financially throughout the campaign channeling millions of dollars in his direction. Earlier in Nightrise, the Chairman and Nightrise executives form a plan to assassinate Senator Trelawny using Scott Tyler, the third of the Five. However this plan fails when Scott's brother Jamie uses his mind powers to tune Scott's powers into killing the wrong person. Despite the plan failing, Charles Baker manages to win the campaign; a vast majority of Americans were very displeased with the results. It is implied Trelawny lost the election due to the votes being rigged at the last minute. Baker makes a brief appearance at the end, making a speech. His eyes aren't quite in focus, implying that the Old Ones could be controlling him, like with Gwenda Davis.

Kelvin Johnson (introduced in Raven's Gate) 
Kelvin Johnson appears in the first book of the series, Raven's Gate. He is Matthew Freeman's friend who smokes and shoplifts. He lives in Ipswich. In Raven's gate, Kelvin convinces Matt to steal from a warehouse that his brother has told him about. They are caught by a security guard, Mark Adams and Kelvin cowardly stabs him in the back and runs off, leaving Matt behind. He is then caught and is taken to a juvenile detention center.

Chaos (introduced in Raven's Gate) 
Chaos appears in all five books, but is first directly mentioned in the third book, Nightrise. He is the King of the Old Ones. How exactly Chaos came into being is unknown, but according to Dravid, Chaos lived on human misery for many years. Eventually, Chaos attempted to take over the world by driving the human race into extinction, but was defeated by five children with supernatural powers called the Gatekeepers. After his defeat, the Gatekeepers imprisoned Chaos in another dimension along with his minions, the Old Ones. The Gatekeepers then built Raven's Gate to prevent Chaos from escaping his extra dimensional prison. Even imprisoned, Chaos had human followers to release him. Two of them were Jayne Deverill and Sir Michael Marsh, who sought to free Chaos and the Old Ones from Raven's Gate by using the blood of one of the Gatekeepers, now reincarnated as teenagers. The two captured the gatekeeper Matt Freeman and Sir Michael Marsh used Matt's blood to open Raven's Gate. With Raven's Gate destroyed, Chaos finally escaped from his prison and crushed Michael to death, having outlived his usefulness. Chaos then proceeded to destroy Matt, who had killed Jayne Deverill, but an explosion caused by the destruction of the power plant caused Raven's Gate to be rebuilt and Chaos is re-imprisoned in his dimension.

John (introduced in Oblivion) 
In Oblivion, John is the adopted grandfather of Holly and George. He lived in the village surrounding St Botolph's Church, Hardham, which is where the Door was the Jamie came through from the Tai Shan Temple in Hong Kong. He was married to Rita.

Alicia McGuire (introduced in Nightrise) 
Alicia McGuire appears in the third book, Nightrise. She is an American woman who used to work for the Presidential Candidate, Senator John Trewlawny. She helps Jamie Tyler try to find his brother, Scott Tyler, when he gets kidnapped. They meet at one of Jamie and Scott's performances, as she is trying to find her son, Daniel, who was kidnapped by the Nightrise organisation due to his clairvoyant powers. Luckily for Jamie, Alicia still had contact with the presidential hopeful. At the end of Nightrise, she is nearly arrested, but then she persuades the police to contact Senator Trelawney. It is presumed he lets her off the hook.

Doorways
The Doorways are a series of 25 doorways built all around the world for the Gatekeepers to use.

The Doors do not lead anywhere normally, except when they are opened by a Gatekeeper. The Gatekeeper can walk in one Door and out of another, with a choice of 25 locations across the world. If a Gatekeeper enters a door without a location in mind, then they will be randomly transported to any of the other Doors. If they enter with a location in mind, that is where they will appear. Each Gatekeeper can also take one companion through the Door with them if they want to: Matt escaped from Hong Kong with Lohan; Richard carried Scarlett through the Door from Hong Kong; Jamie brought Holly with him from St Meredith's Church to Oblivion. The Gatekeepers don't even need to be aware of the Doors, or conscious, to use them; Matt and Scarlett both used the Door from St Meredith's Church without wanting to; Richard carried Scarlett through the Door at Tai Shan Temple when she was unconscious, and it still worked. If any of the 25 Doors are locked, like how Chaos locked the Door at Oblivion using a chain powered by a cosmic force, then all of the other Doors will lock too, rendering them unable to be used until the locked Door is unlocked.

The Doors are located at religious or important sites - but usually, the religious site is built because of the Door. Eleven of the Doors' locations are known specifically, seven are known vaguely, and seven remain unknown. By the time the events of Oblivion took place, the Old Ones knew the locations of nineteen of the doors. The Doors are not always physically doors - they are also known to be caves. For example, the Door at Oblivion in Antarctica was a cave; the Door at Lake Tahoe was a cave; and it is unlikely that there was a physical Door at the Great Pyramid of Giza. The Library in the Dreamworld is a massive structure, and so has Doors around it to allow easy access to all of the Library. As the Library is so vast, it can be presumed that there are hundreds, if not thousands of doors located in it. Only Matt and The Librarian are known to have used these Doors.

Specific Door Locations are:
St Meredith's Church, Moore Street, London, United Kingdom
Mutitjulu Cave, Uluru, Australian Outback
St Botolph's Church, Boston, United Kingdom
Great Pyramid of Giza, near Cairo, Egypt
Tai Shan Temple, Hong Kong (destroyed by the typhoon in Necropolis)
St. Peter's Basilica, Vatican City, Rome.
The Abbey of San Galgano, Lucca, Italy
The Monastery of Cry for Mercy, Ukraine
Lake Tahoe, California and Nevada, United States of America
The Temple of Coricancha, Cuzco, Peru
Basilica de Nossa Senhora de Nazaré, Belém, Brazil
Oblivion, Antarctica
Marktkirche, Hannover, Germany
Vague Door Locations are:
Istanbul, Turkey
Delhi, India
Buenos Aires, Argentina
Tokyo, Japan
Mecca, Saudi Arabia
7 unknown locations.

Trivia
Matt was born to be the leader of the Gatekeepers, the reason unknown.
In his past life, Matt knew all that was going to happen in the future and knew from the start of his life to find the other four boys and girl in his dream. How he knows this is unknown, though it is expected that he read the book of his life, like his future incarnation did.
Matt's name in his past life is never revealed. When Jamie asks him when he goes to the first battle, Matt only tells him that he prefers to use his future reincarnation name.
How the doorways came to be is unknown.
How the gatekeepers along with their companions jumped ten years in time when they entered the door in Tai Shan Temple, Hong Kong, is unclear but it is believed to have something to do with the door being destroyed whilst they were travelling through it.
The story behind the dreamworld is unknown.
In Evil Star, the Inca named Atoc died. But in Oblivion, he comes back in chapter 49. This was confirmed to be a mistake by the author.

Adaptations
Walker Books has so far released graphic novel adaptations for the first three novels in the series, with all three being written by Tony Lee. Raven’s Gate was released on 3 August 2010, with Evil Star and Nightrise released on 2 January 2014 and 6 November 2014 respectively.

In 2012, Horowitz tweeted that he had finished writing a 99 page screenplay of Raven's Gate, describing it as “a bit like Terminator but with demons”. In 2014, there were rumours that Warner Bros. have acquired the film rights to the book series, but Horowitz confirmed on Twitter a few years later that this wasn’t so. As of 2021, despite Horowitz’s wishes and recent success with the Alex Rider series adaptation, there has been no further development as of yet on any possible film or TV adaptation of the Power of Five series.

References

External links
 The Power of Five official website
 Official Anthony Horowitz website
 The Power of Five official Facebook page

British children's novels
Fantasy novel series
Novels by Anthony Horowitz
Walker Books books